Peter Mráz (born 26 August 1975) is a former Slovak footballer who played as a midfielder.

Honours

 Austrian Football First League: 1999-2000

External links
 

1975 births
Living people
Slovak footballers
FC Viktoria Plzeň players
FC Admira Wacker Mödling players
FK Inter Bratislava players
FK Dubnica players
Association football midfielders
Footballers from Bratislava